Yadaaladoddi also spelled as Yeddaldoddi (Basava pura) is a village in the Sindhanur taluk of Raichur district in the Indian state of Karnataka. Virakta matha of Sri Siddalinga swamiji is located in Yaddaladoddi . Yadaladoddi lies on Jawalagera-Olaballari road.

Demographics
As of 2001 India census, Yaddaladoddi had a population of 1,885 with 928 males and 957 females and 379 Households.

See also
Salagunda
Alabanoor
Amba Matha
Olaballari
Sindhanur
Raichur

References

External links
http://raichur.nic.in

Villages in Raichur district